Carlos Montaldo (born 24 January 1940) is an Argentine rower. He competed in the men's coxless pair event at the 1964 Summer Olympics.

References

1940 births
Living people
Argentine male rowers
Olympic rowers of Argentina
Rowers at the 1964 Summer Olympics
Place of birth missing (living people)
Pan American Games medalists in rowing
Pan American Games bronze medalists for Argentina
Rowers at the 1963 Pan American Games